The Marvin Hagler vs. Roberto Duran (or, alternatively, Marvelous Marvin Hagler vs. Roberto Duran, Roberto Duran vs. Marvin Hagler or Roberto Duran vs. Marvelous Marvin Hagler) contest was a professional boxing fight which took place on November 10, 1983, at the Caesar's Palace hotel in Las Vegas, Nevada. It was for Hagler's universally recognized (or undisputed) IBF, WBA and WBC world Middleweight title. Having knocked out Davey Moore in eight rounds on the previous June 16th to win his third divisional world championship, the WBA world Junior Middleweight one, Duran, a Panamanian, was attempting to become the first four division world champion in boxing history. Hagler, meanwhile, had beaten Alan Minter by third round technical knockout in September of 1980 to win the undisputed world Middleweight title, and, after proposed "super-fight" title defenses against Sugar Ray Leonard and Thomas Hearns failed to take place, was making the eighth defense of that championship, his seven  previous defenses all ending in knockout wins for the American champion.

The fight was televised live on closed circuit in the United States and (free of charge) on WAPA-TV in Puerto Rico, where it was worked by sportscaster Rafael Bracero. It was also shown days later in the USA for free on cable station HBO's HBO World Championship Boxing, with Barry Tompkins, Larry Merchant and Duran's archrival (and, later also, Hagler opponent) Sugar Ray Leonard working the HBO show.

The bout caused great expectations both among boxing and non-boxing fans alike, and Ring Magazine produced a rare, special issue about it which came out days before the fight. Other media outlets, such as Sports Illustrated, also covered the event.

Hagler came into the fight with 57 wins, 2 losses and 2 draws (ties), 48 of his wins being by knockout. For his part, Panama's Duran sported a record of 77 wins and 4 losses in 81 professional boxing contests, 58 of his wins by knockout.

The bout's presenter was Chuck Hull; its referee was Stanley Christodoulou of South Africa. Christodoulou, coincidentally, had also refereed Duran's fellow Latin and Central American Alexis Arguello's first attempt versus Aaron Pryor at becoming a four division world boxing champion, which had come almost a year before Hagler-Duran's date, on November 12, 1982 at Miami, Florida. 

Also like Pryor-Arguello I and II (the latter of which was also held at the Caesars Palace hotel), the fight was promoted by Bob Arum.

The fight
The bout was the main event of a program that also included Freddie Roach's 10-round unanimous decision loss in a rematch fight to Louie Burke, and a contest to determine Hagler-Duran's winner's next challenger, between American Frank "The Animal" Fletcher and Argentina's Juan Roldan, which was won by Roldan by a brutal, blistering sixth round knockout.

Hagler won the fight by a fifteen rounds unanimous decision.

Despite what boxing fans and experts expected, it was a largely tactical affair, with Duran unexpectedly boxing from outside (he is mostly remembered as an in-fighter) while Hagler awaited for his opportunities, picking his shots.

Duran led on the three official judges' scorecards after thirteen rounds by one point on each. But Hagler dominated rounds fourteen and fifteen to forge ahead and retain his titles by a close but unanimous decision, the scores reading 146-145 (on judge Yusaku Yoshida's), 144-143 (on Ove Ovesen's) and 142-141 (on Guy Jutras') on the cards, all in favor of champion Hagler.

Aftermath
Hagler then retained his title 4 more times, including victories over Roldan, over Hearns and John Mugabi before losing it on his final fight, to Ray Leonard on April 6th, 1987. He retired with a record of 62 wins, 3 losses and 2 draws (ties), with 52 wins by knockout, after which he moved to Italy and became an actor, filming various movies in that European country and a commercial in the United States for Pizza Hut. He was inducted into the International Boxing Hall of Fame 14 years before Duran was, in 1993.

On the other hand, Duran lost on his very next fight to Hearns and retired immediately after that, but he made several comebacks afterwards, including one where he actually realized his dream of becoming a four division world champion (albeit being the third one, not the first one as he'd been had he won against Hagler; Hearns and Leonard were boxing's first and second four division world champions, respectively) against Iran Barkley, fights with Vinny Paz and Hector Camacho (twice each; Duran lost to both twice each by decisions) William Joppy-a third-round technical knockout loss for Joppy's WBA world Middleweight title- and a rubber match with Leonard (they had beaten each other once each before). Duran retired with 103 wins and 16 losses in 119 contests, 70 of those wins coming by knockout. Duran went on to record Salsa music albums as a singer and was in Argentina promoting one of his albums when he suffered a life-threatening car accident in 2000, which caused him to retire from boxing. In 2016, a movie about him, Hands of Stone, was released. That movie was based on a book about Duran written by American author Christian Giudice. Duran was inducted to the International Boxing Hall of Fame in 2007.

Undercard
Confirmed bouts:
Louie Burke W 10 Freddie Roach
Juan Roldan KO 6 Frank Fletcher
Charlie ("White Lightning") Brown W 10 Frank Newton
Luis Santana KO 2 Jesus Gonzalez (not to be confused with a 2000s boxer of the same name)

References

Boxing matches
Boxing on HBO
November 1983 sports events in the United States
1983 in boxing